Tex & the Horseheads is an American punk rock band, which emerged in the Los Angeles punk subculture of the early-1980.  Their original run was from 1980 to 1986 and during this time they enjoyed a sizeable cult following. As of 2007, the band has reunited and tours the Los Angeles area sporadically.

Biography
Tex & the Horseheads are often cited as among the first bands to play "cowpunk." The sound of Tex & the Horseheads, and correspondingly the sound of cowpunk, is characterized by a fusion of classic-styled country-and-Western music and street-tough LA punk bands.

Tex & the Horseheads set themselves apart by appropriating aesthetical and fashion elements from deathrock bands like Burning Image, 45 Grave, and Christian Death. Tex & the Horseheads' members include: Texacala Jones, Mike Martt, Gregory "Smog Boaz" and David "Rock" Thum. Jeffrey Lee Pierce, of The Gun Club, was an original member of the group and was highly influential in both supporting the formation of the group.

Tex and the Horseheads released two records, a self-titled record in 1984 and Life's So Cool, produced  in 1985 by John Doe, member of X and of the Flesh Eaters. A live album, titled Tot Ziens; Live in Holland, was released by Enigma Records in 1986.

Their songs dealt with themes of heartbreak, love, drug and alcohol dependency, grief, loss, and financial difficulty—all a testament to their destitute roll-and-tumble lifestyle, as well as Texacala' s real-life struggles with alcohol and heroin in the latter half of the 1980.

Member appearances in film
During the Horseheads’ heyday, Tex appeared in a few small movie roles, including Border Radio (1987), a gritty, 16mm trailer-park dramedy starring the Flesh Eaters frontman Chris D., where she played a ditzy babysitter; Du-Beat-eo (1984), a comic-slop pseudo-documentary about the LA punk scene, starring Joan Jett and Stephen (Café Flesh) Sayadian's weirdo 1989 remake of Dr. Caligari, where she played a mental patient in a frightwig and a straitjacket. Tex also appeared in the 1985 film, The Boys Next Door, as the member of a street band.

Collaborations
Until disappearing from the Los Angeles music scene in the 1990s, Texacala performed with all-girl cowpunk group, the Screaming Sirens. In 1987 she formed Texorcist along w/ Dave Catching on Guitar, Billy Koepke on Bass & Louie Dufau on Drums, In the late 1980s, Texacala participated in an all women's performance troupe of LA scene-makers, The Ringling Sisters, whose members all fronted Los Angeles based bands. Members of the group included Pleasant Gehman (Screamin' Sirens), Iris Berry (Lame Flames), Debbie Dexter (Devil Squares), Debbie Patino (Raszebrae) and Johnette Napolitano (Concrete Blonde). Tex's role in The Ringling Sisters involved performing as a story teller and back-up singer.

Texacala recorded a solo record in 1998, and subsequently toured extensively with a backing band the TJ Hookers, as well as fronting Texorcist and working with Los Platos. In 1994 she formed Burnin' Bridges along with former Texorcist Bassist Billy Koepke. They recorded 10 songs for a planned record with Richie Ramone producing but the record was never released.

Reunion
In 2007, Tex & the Horseheads reunited and played shows around the LA area. Texacala has since moved to Austin, Texas and has remained active in music there.

Future plans
Texacala has stated that she plans to write a book detailing her experiences as a musician. She has also stated that she plans to "Have some new songs coming out on itunes and plan on putting them all on cd soon for the website I'm working on. I want to make as many of my recordings available as possible, posters, flyers."

References

External links
  Video on Youtube of Big HousePart III

Cowpunk musical groups
Punk rock groups from California
American death rock groups
Punk blues musical groups
Enigma Records artists